Corozal South West is an electoral constituency in the Corozal District represented in the House of Representatives of the National Assembly of Belize.

Area Representatives

References 

 

Political divisions in Belize
Corozal South West
Belizean House constituencies established in 1984